The 1966 Soviet Class A Second Group was the fourth season of the Soviet Class A Second Group football competitions that was established in 1963. It was also the 26th season of the Soviet second tier league competition. The competitions became again split completely by geographical principle as before the 1963 league's consolidation reform.

First stage

First subgroup

Top scorers
14 goals
 Zhak Suprikyan (Shirak Leninakan)

13 goals
 Bondo Giorgadze (Dinamo Batumi)
 Anatoliy Mironov (Kuban Krasnodar)

Number of teams by republics

Second subgroup

Top scorers
13 goals
 Volodymyr Dudarenko (SKA Lvov)

12 goals
 János Gabovda (Lokomotiv Vinnitsa)

11 goals
 Vladimir Voinov (Dinamo Leningrad)

Number of teams by republics

Third subgroup

Top scorers
16 goals
 Viktor Abgoltz (Shakhter Karaganda)

14 goals
 Bohdan Keslo (Politotdel Tashkent Oblast)

13 goals
 Yusup Musayev (Alga Frunze)
 Boris Brykin (Temp Barnaul)

Number of teams by republics

Final stage

For places 1-3
 [Oct 25 – Nov 16]

For places 4-6
 [Oct 29 – Nov 14]

See also
 Soviet First League

External links
 1966 season. RSSSF

1966
2
Soviet
Soviet